Lithops coleorum is a small flowering succulent plant of the family Aizoaceae. It is native to South Africa.

It is named for the botanical collectors Desmond Thorne Cole and his wife Naureen Adele Cole.

Appearance
Yellow flowers.

References

coleorum